The 274th Infantry Division was an infantry division of the German Heer during World War II.

History 
The 274th Infantry Division's assembly was ordered on 26 May 1943 and began on 1 July. It was formed in occupied Norway as a static (i.e. non-motorized) formation. The division's initial commander was Wilhelm Russwurm. Its initial two regiments, numbered 862 and 865, as well as its artillery regiment were assembled from the battalions and detachments of other divisions in Norway:

 The battalions of Grenadier Regiment 862 were previously the second battalion of Grenadier Regiment 730 (710th Infantry Division), the first battalion of Grenadier Regiment 355 (214th Infantry Division), and the second battalion of Grenadier Regiment 469 (269th Infantry Division).
 The battalions of Grenadier Regiment 865 were previously the third battalion of Fusilier Regiment 334 (181st Infantry Division), the third battalion of Grenadier Regiment 340 (196th Infantry Division), and the third battalion of Grenadier Regiment 345 (199th Infantry Division).
 The three detachments of Artillery Regiment 274 were previously the second detachment of Artillery Regiment 214 (230th Infantry Division), the second detachment of Artillery Regiment 269 (269th Infantry Division), and the third detachment of Artillery Regiment 222 (181st Infantry Division).

The Grenadier Regiments 862 and 865 were also alternatively called Fortress Infantry Regiments in the German military postal service.

On 27 October 1944, Kurt Weckmann took command of the division.

The division did not see combat until German surrender. Subsequently, it was taken prisoner by British forces.

Superior formations

Noteworthy individuals 

 Wilhelm Russwurm, divisional commander between 26 May 1943 and 27 October 1944.
 Kurt Weckmann, divisional commander between 27 October 1944 and 8 May 1945.

References 

Infantry divisions of Germany during World War II
Military units and formations established in 1943
Military units and formations disestablished in 1945